In Gallo-Roman religion, Rosmerta was a goddess of fertility and abundance, her attributes being those of plenty such as the cornucopia. Rosmerta is attested by statues and by inscriptions. In Gaul she was often depicted with the Roman god Mercury as her consort, but is sometimes found independently.

Etymology
The name Rosmerta is Gaulish, and is analysed as ro-smert-a. Smert means "provider" or "carer" and is also found in other Gaulish names such as Ad-smerio, Smertu-litani, Smerius (Σμερο), Smertae, Smertus, and others. Ro- is a modifier meaning "very", "great", or "most" as found in Ro-bili ("most-good") or Ro-cabalus ("great horse"). The -a ending is the typical Gaulish feminine singular nominative. The meaning is thus "the Great Provider".

Iconography
A relief from Autun (ancient Augustodunum, the civitas capital of the Celtic Aedui), shows Rosmerta and Mercury seated together as a divine couple. She holds a cornucopia, with Mercury holding a patera at her left side.

A bas-relief from Eisenberg shows the couple in the same relative positions, with Rosmerta securely identified by the inscription. Rosmerta holds a purse in her right hand and a patera in her left.

In a pair of statues from Paris depicting the couple, Rosmerta holds a cornucopia and a basket of fruits.

Rosmerta is shown by herself on a bronze statue from Fins d'Annency (Haute-Savoie), where she sits on a rock holding a purse and, unusually, also bears the wings of Mercury on her head. A stone bas-relief from Escolives-Sainte-Camille shows her holding both a patera and a cornucopia.

Inscriptions

Twenty-seven inscriptions to Rosmerta are listed by Jufer and Luginbühl, distributed in France, Germany and Luxembourg, corresponding mainly to the Roman provinces of Gallia Belgica and Germania Superior. An additional two inscriptions are known, one from Roman Dacia.

An inscription from Metz is a dedication (votum) to Mercury and Rosmerta jointly. Another from Eisenberg was made by a decurion in fulfillment of a vow to the couple jointly.

In two inscriptions both from Gallia Belgica, Rosmerta is given the epithet sacra, sacred. A lengthier inscription from Wasserbillig in Gallia Belgica associates the divine couple with the dedication of a shrine (aedes), with "hospitable" rites to be celebrated.

See also

 Dalheim
 Visucia
 Maia

Notes

References
 Année Epigraphique volumes 1967, 1987, 1998
 Corpus Inscriptionum Latinarum (CIL), volume 13, Tres Galliae ("The Three Gauls")
 
 
 

Gaulish goddesses
Fertility goddesses
Abundance goddesses
Mercurian deities